This is a list of settlements in Evrytania, Greece.

 Agia Triada
 Agia Vlacherna
 Agios Andreas
 Agios Charalampos
 Agios Dimitrios
 Agios Nikolaos
 Agrafa
 Alestia
 Ampliani
 Anatoliki Fragkista
 Aniada
 Aspropyrgos
 Chelidona
 Chochlia
 Chryso
 Dafni
 Dermati
 Domianoi
 Domnista
 Dytiki Fragkista
 Epiniana
 Episkopi
 Esochoria
 Fidakia
 Fourna
 Granitsa
 Kalesmeno
 Karitsa
 Karpenisi
 Kastania
 Katavothra
 Kedra
 Kerasochori
 Klafsi
 Kleisto
 Koryschades
 Krikello
 Lepiana
 Limeri
 Lithochori
 Marathia
 Marathos
 Mavrommata
 Megalo Chorio
 Mesokomi
 Mikro Chorio
 Monastiraki
 Mouzilo
 Myriki
 Neo Argyri
 Nostimo
 Palaiochori
 Palaiokatouna
 Papparousi
 Pavlopoulo
 Petralona
 Prasia
 Prodromos
 Prousos
 Psiana
 Raptopoulo
 Roska
 Sarkini
 Sella
 Sivista
 Stavloi
 Stavrochori
 Stefani
 Stenoma
 Sygkrellos
 Topoliana
 Tornos
 Tridendro
 Tripotamo
 
 Valaora
 Velota
 Viniani
 Voulpi
 Voutyro
 Vracha
 Vrangiana

By municipality

 
Evrytania